Christopher Trotman "Trot" Nixon (born April 11, 1974) is an American former professional baseball right fielder. He played in Major League Baseball (MLB) from 1996 through 2008, primarily with the Boston Red Sox from 1996 through 2006, with whom he was a fan favorite for his scrappy play and won the 2004 World Series, ending the Curse of the Bambino. His career wound down with limited appearances for the Cleveland Indians in 2007 and the New York Mets in 2008. He currently serves as co-host/analyst for "The 5th Quarter," a high school football highlight show on WWAY-TV in his hometown of Wilmington, North Carolina.

Youth and high school career
Nixon was born in Durham, North Carolina and attended New Hanover High School in Wilmington, North Carolina. As a senior, he was named the State Player of the Year in both football and baseball. In football, as a senior, he broke school passing records held by former National Football League quarterbacks Sonny Jurgensen and Roman Gabriel. In baseball, as a senior, he was named the Baseball America High School Player of the Year and the State Player of the Year, and helped lead his team to the State 4A title, and finished his senior season with a .512 batting average, 12 home runs and a state-record 56 RBI, and pitched 40 innings with a 12–0 record and a 0.40 ERA.  Nixon was slated to play both football and baseball at North Carolina State on a scholarship, and when negotiations with the Boston Red Sox continued to the fall, he participated in fall practice at NC State.  He eventually signed with the Boston Red Sox at the signing deadline, the day classes began.

Professional career

Boston Red Sox
Nixon was drafted by the Red Sox in the 1st round of the 1993 Major League Baseball Draft, and was the seventh pick overall. He split the 1994-1998 seasons between several A, AA, and AAA minor league teams, with two brief stints with the Red Sox on the major league level in 1996 and 1998.

Nixon's first full season in the majors was in 1999, when he played in 124 games and hit .270 with 15 home runs and 52 RBIs. He came in 9th place in Rookie of the Year voting with just a single vote point (Carlos Beltrán of the Kansas City Royals won the award by a landslide).

Nixon quickly became a fan favorite for his scrappy, enthusiastic gameplay. He was considered the inspiration for the expression "Boston Dirt Dogs." The signature is that of a "scrapper," a player who hustles and usually gets his uniform dirty during games.

After a decent 2000 season, Nixon produced career highs (at the time) during the 2001 season with a .280 batting average, 27 home runs, and 88 RBIs.

The 2002 season was also a good one for Nixon: he posted career bests in doubles (36) and RBIs (94). On May 5, 2002, in response to several hits by pitches, Nixon threw his bat in the direction of Tampa Bay Devil Rays pitcher Ryan Rupe, pretending that the bat slipped out of his hands while swinging. In response, Bob Watson, the Major League Baseball vice president in charge of discipline, fined him $2,000 and suspended him four games.

Nixon had the best year of his career in 2003, batting .306 with 28 home runs and 87 RBIs. On October 4, 2003, in Game 3 of the American League Division Series, he had the most prominent moment of his career. Nixon was called from the bench as a pinch hitter in the bottom of the 11th. With the Red Sox facing elimination, Nixon lined a two-run homer over the center field wall for a 3–1 Boston victory. The Red Sox went on to win the next two games, stunning the Oakland Athletics with a 3-2 series win and advancing to the American League Championship Series against the New York Yankees. The Red Sox lost the ALCS in seven games despite Nixon batting .333 (8 for 24) with 3 home runs and 5 RBIs in the series.

During the 2004 season, Nixon was unavailable for several months due to a herniated disc and a tight thigh muscle. Upon his return, he generally worked as the starting right fielder during the regular and post-season. In the deciding game of the 2004 World Series, Nixon hit a two-out, two-run double off the right field wall at Busch Stadium in St. Louis in the top of the third inning to give Boston a 3–0 lead. Those were the last runs either team scored in that game as the Red Sox swept the Cardinals for the team's first World Series title in 86 years. For the series, Nixon batted .357 (5 for 14) with 3 doubles and 3 RBIs.

Nixon also endeared himself to Sox fans by briefly wearing a mohawk hairstyle, one of many unconventional and bizarre hairstyles the Sox sported over the course of the 2004 season.

Loved by Boston's fans, Nixon is known for an extremely volatile temper and steadfast dedication to his teammates. In August 2005, while officially on the disabled list, Nixon remained in uniform and in the dugout with the rest of the team during the game. When teammate Gabe Kapler (who often acted as Nixon's right field replacement) hit a long fly ball off of the Green Monster, the umpires ruled it a double. Nixon leapt off the bench and argued with such passion that Kapler's hit had been a home run (television replays confirmed that the hit had landed above the home run line, and thus should have been ruled a two-run homer) that he was ejected from the game.

On October 1, 2006, with two outs in the fifth inning of the final game of the season, manager Terry Francona replaced Nixon in right field with rookie David Murphy. Knowing Nixon might be playing his final game with the Sox, the fans gave him a grateful ovation as he ran off the field. Said Nixon, when asked if it was difficult playing what may have been his last game for the Red Sox:

After the 2006 season, the Red Sox did not offer Nixon salary arbitration as the team pursued and eventually signed free agent J. D. Drew and had a fourth outfielder, Wily Mo Peña, on the roster.

In 2010, Red Sox manager Terry Francona compared rookie Red Sox outfielder Ryan Kalish's intensity and aggressiveness to Nixon's.

Cleveland Indians

In January 2007, Nixon signed a one-year, $3 million contract with the Cleveland Indians. Instead of wearing number 7 as he had in Boston, Nixon chose number 33. The decision was made in part by his son Chase, based on the fact that Nixon turned 33 years old that April.

Arizona Diamondbacks
In February 2008, he signed a minor league contract with an invitation to spring training with the Arizona Diamondbacks and was subsequently sent to their Triple-A affiliate the Tucson Sidewinders.

New York Mets
On June 13, 2008, Nixon was acquired by the New York Mets from the Diamondbacks for cash considerations and a player to be named later. The Mets acquired him to replace injured outfielder Moisés Alou. He was added to the Mets roster on June 15, replacing outfielder Chris Aguila who was designated for assignment. The same day he was activated, Nixon started in right field against the Texas Rangers. However, he finished the season on the disabled list.

Milwaukee Brewers
On December 18, 2008, Nixon signed a minor league contract with the Milwaukee Brewers. He was put onto the inactive roster. After his release from the Brewers in March 2009, Nixon retired from baseball.

Career statistics
In 1092 games over 12 seasons, Nixon posted a .274 batting average (995-for-3627) with 579 runs, 222 doubles, 28 triples, 137 home runs, 555 RBI, 30 stolen bases, 504 bases on balls, .364 on-base percentage and .464 slugging percentage. Defensively, he recorded a .983 fielding percentage primarily as a right fielder but also has played at center and left field. In 42 postseason games, he was productive, batting .283 (39-for-138) with 18 runs, 11 doubles, 6 home runs, 25 RBI and 14 walks.

Personal life
Nixon became an evangelical Christian in 1993. Nixon said he relied on his faith as a calming influence on the field.

Nixon is married to his wife, Kathryn, with whom he has two sons, Chase (born September 11, 2001) and Luke (born October 1, 2004). He was flying back to Boston to be at Chase's birth when air traffic was halted due to the September 11 attacks on the World Trade Center in New York City.

He and his family reside in Wilmington, North Carolina. He co-hosts "The 5th Quarter", a Friday night high school football highlight show on WWAY-TV. His father also lives in Wilmington, and his grandmother and cousins live in Hertford, North Carolina.

In October 2018, Nixon threw out the ceremonial first pitch of the American League Division Series to Dustin Pedroia, and collected donations outside of Fenway Park for Hurricane Florence victims.

See also
 Dirt Dog

References

External links

1974 births
Living people
Boston Red Sox players
Cleveland Indians players
New York Mets players
Sportspeople from Durham, North Carolina
Baseball players from North Carolina
Major League Baseball right fielders
Lynchburg Red Sox players
Sarasota Red Sox players
Trenton Thunder players
Pawtucket Red Sox players
Gulf Coast Red Sox players
Gulf Coast Mets players
Tucson Sidewinders players
New Orleans Zephyrs players
Sportspeople from Wilmington, North Carolina
Converts to evangelical Christianity
American evangelicals